Tournan is a commune in the Gers department in southwestern France.

Geography

Localisation

Hydrography 
The river Gesse forms most of the commune's southeastern border.

Population

See also
Communes of the Gers department

References

Communes of Gers